Colston Bassett is an English village in the Vale of Belvoir, in the Rushcliffe district of south-east Nottinghamshire, close to its border with Leicestershire. It lies by the River Smite. The population in 2001 of 225, including Wiverton Hall, increased to 399 at the 2011 Census.

Place name and history
The name, first recorded in the Domesday Book as Coletone, is from the Old Norse personal name Kolr (genitive Kols), and the Old English tūn "farm or village", and so means "Kolr's farm or village". Alternatively, it has been suggested that it derives from Cole meaning "coal" or "stone". The suffix Bassett is from the holder of the estate in the 12th century, Ralph Bassett, a judge appointed by Henry I.

The history of the village is recorded in some detail in the publication A History of Colston Bassett by Rev. Evelyn Young, edited for the Thoroton Society in 1942 by Thomas M. Blagg. The First World War cost the village at least 14 lives, listed on the war memorial in St John's Church.

Amenities
The village dairy, which opened in 1913, is one of only five that are permitted to name their blue cheese Stilton cheese. It also manufactures smaller quantities of White Stilton and Shropshire Blue.

Colston Bassett contains an old market cross, a ruined church of St Mary, Colston Bassett Preparatory School for children between 4–11 years, a pub, the Martins Arms, a riding school, and animal boarding kennels.

The parish church is St John's Church, Colston Bassett.

Transport
Colston Bassett has weekday, daytime bus services to Radcliffe on Trent and Nottingham. The nearest railway stations are at Radcliffe (4.1 miles, 6.6 km) and Bingham (5.7 miles, 9 km), with hourly or two-hourly services to and beyond Nottingham and Grantham.

The A46 trunk road between Leicester and Newark on Trent passes 1.9 miles (3 km) to the west of the village, and the A52 between Nottingham and Grantham 5.6 miles (9 km) to the north. The M1 motorway between London and Leeds can be reached at Junction 25 (24 miles, 39 km).

References

External links
Colston Bassett village website
Colston Bassett Dairy
Colston Bassett School
Colston Bassett Local History Group

External links

Villages in Nottinghamshire
Rushcliffe